The Episcopal Diocese of Southwest Florida is a diocese of the Episcopal Church in the United States of America (ECUSA) in  Florida which extends from Marco Island on the south, to Brooksville on the north, and inland to Plant City, Arcadia and LaBelle on the east.  As part of the ECUSA, the diocese is a constituent member of the worldwide Anglican Communion.

Major cities in the diocese are Tampa, St. Petersburg, Clearwater, Fort Myers, Sarasota, and Bradenton. The diocese includes the western half of Hendry County, the mainland portion of Monroe County, and all of the counties of Hernando, Pasco, Pinellas, Hillsborough, Manatee, Sarasota, DeSoto, Charlotte, Lee, and Collier.

The diocese is a part of Province IV of the Episcopal Church, historically known as the Province of Sewanee.
The current Diocesan Bishop of Southwest Florida is Dabney T. Smith. The cathedral church of the diocese is Cathedral Church of St. Peter in St. Petersburg. The diocesan offices are in Parrish, Florida on the campus of the DaySpring Episcopal Center. The diocese currently comprises 78 churches.

History
The Diocese of Southwest Florida was created in 1969 when the  Diocese of South Florida was split to form the dioceses of Central Florida, Southeast Florida and Southwest Florida.

Historic church buildings in the Diocese include Ft. Myers Beach's St. Raphael's, St. James House of Prayer, and St. Andrew's, Tampa, Cathedral Church of St. Peter, St. Petersburg, Sarasota's Church of the Redeemer and DaySpring Episcopal Center's St. Thomas Chapel, formerly the Church of the Holy Spirit, Safety Harbor.

Bishops of the diocese
The Bishops of the Diocese of Southwest Florida are:

1969–1975: William L. Hargrave
1975–1988: Emerson Paul Haynes
1989–1997: Rogers Sanders Harris
1997–2007: John Bailey Lipscomb
2007–present: Dabney Tyler Smith

NOTE: For earlier bishops, see the Episcopal Diocese of South Florida

Deaneries
In accordance with the usage in the ECUSA, the diocese is divided into seven deaneries as follows:

Clearwater Deanery: Clearwater, Dunedin, Hudson, Indian Rocks Beach, Largo, New Port Richey, Palm Harbor, Safety Harbor, Seminole, Spring Hill and Tarpon Springs. The Rev. Randy Hehr, Dean.
Fort Myers Deanery: Cape Coral, Fort Myers, Fort Myers Beach, LaBelle, Lehigh Acres, North Fort Myers, Pine Island and Sanibel. The Rev. Dr. Ellen Sloan, Dean.
Manasota Deanery: Anna Maria, Arcadia, Bradenton, Longboat Key, Osprey, Palmetto and Sarasota: The Very Rev. Fredrick A. Robinson, Dean.
Naples Deanery: Bonita Springs, Marco Island and Naples. The Rev. Kyle Bennett, Dean.
St. Petersburg Deanery: Pinellas Park, St. Petersburg and St. Pete Beach: The Rev. Stephen B. Morris, Dean.
Tampa Deanery: Brooksville, Dade City, Plant City, Ruskin, Tampa, Temple Terrace, Valrico and Zephyrhills. The Rev. Charles Connelly, Dean.
Venice Deanery: Boca Grande, Englewood, North Port, Osprey, Port Charlotte, Punta Gorda and Venice. The Rev. Michelle Robertshaw, Dean.

See also

Episcopal Church in the United States of America
St. Andrews Episcopal Church
St. James House of Prayer Episcopal Church
Christianity
Anglican Communion

References

Bibliography
Cushman, Joseph D., Jr., A Goodly Heritage: The Episcopal Church in Florida, 1821-1892, Gainesville: University of Florida Press (1965)

External links
The Diocese of Southwest Florida
St. Peter’s Cathedral – St. Petersburg
The Episcopal Church in the United States of America

Southwest Florida
Episcopal Church in Florida
Christian organizations established in 1969
Province 4 of the Episcopal Church (United States)